San Salvador and Rum Cay is a former district of the Bahamas.
The Main settlement in Rum Cay is Port Nelson.
In 1996 it was divided into separate districts of San Salvador and Rum Cay.

Former districts of the Bahamas